"The Limo" is the 19th episode of the third season of the American sitcom Seinfeld (The 36th episode overall). It aired on February 26, 1992.

Plot
Jerry flies in from Chicago and George arrives to take him home. His car has broken down on the Belt Parkway, stranding them at the airport. Jerry points out a limousine chauffeur with a sign saying "O'Brien". Jerry had seen an O'Brien in Chicago complaining to airport staff that he had to reach Madison Square Garden. Since O'Brien's flight is overbooked and he will not be arriving in New York soon, George suggests they pose as O'Brien and his colleague and take the limo home. George assumes the identity of O'Brien, and Jerry makes up the name Dylan Murphy. The chauffeur lets them into the limo and says he has the four passes. George remembers the Knicks are playing the Bulls that night at MSG. Excited at the prospect of seeing the game live, Jerry calls Elaine on the limo's phone and tells her to wait with Kramer for them to pick them up for the game, and to call him and George by their pseudonyms.

The chauffeur stops to pick up a man, Tim (Peter Krause), and a woman, Eva (Suzanne Snyder), for whom two of the passes are evidently intended. Eva and Tim tell Jerry that they are great fans of O'Brien's newsletter and book, The Big Game, but have never met O'Brien or even seen a picture of him. Eva invites George to read over a faxed copy of the speech he is to deliver that night. It is full of remarks expounding antisemitism and white supremacy. A loud bang is heard outside. Tim pulls out a pistol and exits the car, but it is just a flat tire. Preparing for a real attack, Tim pulls out a briefcase of pistols. A news report reveals that Donald O'Brien, head of the regional chapter of the Aryan Union, a high-profile Neo-Nazi organization, is scheduled to make his first public appearance at the Paramount Theater, adjacent to MSG, to deliver the speech at a rally. Crowd control officers have lined up several barricades to keep away hordes of protesters.

Kramer comments on how suspicious George and Jerry's meeting arrangements are. Kramer and Elaine run into her friend Dan and his friends, who tell them they are going to the rally to protest O'Brien. Since this is his first public appearance, none of them knows what he looks like. Kramer recognizes the name from Jerry's instructions, and suspects Jerry of leading a double life as Donald O'Brien.

George and Jerry plan to have the limo drive back to the Upper West Side and get out when they see Elaine and Kramer. Protesters across the street spot them, forcing all four of them to retreat into the limo. As the protesters chase the limo down the street, the real O'Brien calls the limo to let them know of his delay. Tim and Eva draw their guns and demand an explanation. Jerry, George and Elaine nervously talk over each other as protesters surround the limo and begin rocking it. Exasperated, Eva orders them all out. Elaine and Dan meet again awkwardly while news teams identify a panicked George as O'Brien.

References

External links

Seinfeld (season 3) episodes
1992 American television episodes
Television episodes about neo-Nazism
Television episodes about antisemitism